Aougrout is a commune in Aougrout District, Adrar Province, in south-central Algeria. According to the 2008 census it has a population of 11,784, up from 9,878 in 1998, with an annual growth rate of 1.8%.

Geography

Most of the villages of the commune are located on the eastern side of the oasis. Most of the region surrounding the oasis is a flat rocky plain (a reg), but some low hills rise to the east and south-east.

Climate

Aougrout has a hot desert climate (Köppen climate classification BWh), with extremely hot summers and mild winters, and very little precipitation throughout the year.

Transportation

Aougrout is connected by a road leading north to Timimoun, a road leading west to the Deldoul oasis, and a road leading southwest to Tsabit (and from there to Adrar via the N6 national highway).

Education

6.4% of the population has a tertiary education, and another 15.3% has completed secondary education. The overall literacy rate is 75.8%, and is 88.0% among males and 63.5% among females.

Localities
As of 1984, the commune was composed of 11 localities:

Tiberrhamine
Ksar El Hadj
Tinekline
Tala
Zaouiet Sidi Abdellah
Aboud Ben Ayed
Akbour
Zaouiet Sidi Omeur Charef
Bou Guema

References

Neighbouring towns and cities

Communes of Adrar Province